Narail-2 is a constituency represented in the Jatiya Sangsad (National Parliament) of Bangladesh since 2019 by Mashrafe Mortaza of the Awami League.

Boundaries 
The constituency encompasses Lohagara Upazila and all but five union parishads of Narail Sadar Upazila: Bhadrabila, Bichhali, Kalora, Shaikhati, and Singasolpur.

History 
The constituency was created in 1984 from a Jessore constituency when the former Jessore District was split into four districts: Jhenaidah, Jessore, Magura, and Narail.

Members of Parliament

Elections

Elections in the 2010s

Elections in the 2000s 

Sheikh Hasina stood for five seats in the October 2001 general election: Rangpur-6, Narail-1, Narail-2, Barguna-3, and Gopalganj-3. After winning all but Rangpur-6, she chose to represent Gopalganj-3 and quit the other three, triggering by-elections in them. Shahidul Islam of the BNP was elected in a January 2002 by-election.

Elections in the 1990s

References

External links
 

Parliamentary constituencies in Bangladesh
Narail District